Mike Cassidy is an American entrepreneur, and was CEO and co-founder of five previous Internet start-ups including Stylus Innovation, Direct Hit, Xfire, Ruba.com, and Apollo Fusion. In January 2012, he became director of product management and subsequently a Vice President  at Google and led Project Loon with Google[x]. In April 2017 it was reported he is working on a clean energy startup, Apollo Fusion, using a hybrid reactor technology based on fusion power.

Education
Cassidy was educated at the Massachusetts Institute of Technology (BS '85, MS '86 in Aerospace Engineering), Harvard Business School (1991), and studied jazz piano at the Berklee College of Music.

Career
His first success, Stylus Innovation, was started with $500 each from Cassidy and his two co-founders, Krisztina Holly and John Barrus, and subsequently won the MIT 10K (now called the MIT $100K Entrepreneurship Competition).  The company was later sold to Artisoft for $13 million in 1996.   His second effort was early Internet search engine Direct Hit, which was sold to Ask Jeeves for $532.5 million in January 2000 only 500 days after launch.  Cassidy's next effort was Xfire, a freeware instant messaging service aimed at gamers.  Xfire was sold to Viacom on April 25, 2006 for $110 million.

After a stint as an EIR at Benchmark Capital, Mike founded Ruba with Arnaud Weber, who was previously a technical lead for the Chrome browser project at Google.  Ruba was acquired by Google in May, 2010. 

Most recently, Cassidy co-founded and served as CEO of Apollo Fusion, an electric in-space satellite propulsion company. The company was acquired by Astra (NASDAQ:ASTR) on June 7, 2021 for $145 million.

Cassidy is perhaps best known for his promotion of "speed as the primary business strategy."  He has given numerous talks on the subject, and his Slideshare presentation on the subject has received over 75,900 views.

Awards
Mike is also the recipient of the DEMO Lifetime Achievement award.

References

External links
 Xfire.com
 Ruba.com
 Michael Cassidy official site
 A panel discussion with Mike Cassidy, Stanford Graduate School of Business
 Apollo Fusion

American computer businesspeople
Living people
Google employees
Year of birth missing (living people)